William Gibbons may refer to:

William Gibbons (explorer), English explorer of Canadian waters; see 
William Gibbons (American politician) (1726–1800), American lawyer and delegate to the Continental Congress
William Gibbons (British politician) (1898–1976), British politician
William Conrad Gibbons (1926–2015), American historian and foreign policy expert
William D. Gibbons (1825–1886), African-American Baptist minister
William M. Gibbons (1919–1990), American lawyer and railroad executive
Bill Gibbons, American attorney
Bill Gibbons (basketball), American basketball coach
Billy Gibbons (born 1949), American guitarist

See also
 Bill Gibbins (1872–1956), Chairman of Everton F.C.